Connected is an American documentary web series on AOL On, executive produced by Morgan Spurlock. The first season, in which 6 NYC stories are included, was released on March 31, 2015. The show was adapted from the Israeli version with the same name MEHUBARIM מחוברים, originally produced by Koda Communications. The show's creators are Ram Landes and Doron Zabari and the director is Ami Teer.

The show follows 6 participants, each from a different background who film themselves with no crew involved, only using a hand-held video camera. The show's participants quickly become their own directors who are able to tell their own story using the cameras that they were given. During the production, about 2000 hours of raw footage was collected, which has been edited to 20 episodes of about 25 minutes each.

The original docu-drama format was sold to more than 17 production companies and distribution channels from countries including Denmark, France, Ireland, India, Norway, Finland and the USA. The US version has been produced by Koda Communications, an Israeli production company created by Ram Landes, which produces the Israeli version as well.

Episodes

Season 1 (2015)

References

2010s American documentary television series
2015 American television series debuts
Television shows filmed in New York (state)
Television shows set in New York City
Nonlinear narrative television series
Hispanic and Latino American television